Villosa taeniata, the painted creekshell, is a species of freshwater mussel, an aquatic bivalve mollusk in the family Unionidae.

The glochidia of this species are hosted by the rock bass (Ambloplites rupestris).

References

taeniata
Bivalves described in 1834